Klikovac or Klikovać is a South Slavic surname, and may refer to:

 Andrea Klikovac (born 1991), Montenegrin handball player
 Bobana Klikovac (born 1995), Montenegrin handball player
 Filip Klikovać (born 1989), Montenegrin water polo player
 Klaudija Bubalo née Klikovac (born 1970), Croatian handball player

South Slavic-language surnames